The 45th parallel north is a circle of latitude that is 45 degrees north of Earth's equator. It crosses Europe, Asia, the Pacific Ocean, North America, and the Atlantic Ocean.

At this latitude, the sun is visible for 15 hours 37 minutes during the summer solstice, and 8 hours 46 minutes during the winter solstice.  The midday Sun stands 21.6° above the southern horizon at the December solstice, 68.4° at the June solstice, and exactly 45.0° at either equinox.

Around the world
Starting at the Prime Meridian and heading eastwards, the parallel 45° north passes through:

{| class="wikitable plainrowheaders" style="width: 67%;"
! scope="col" width="125" | Co-ordinates
! scope="col" | Country, territoryor sea
! scope="col" | Notes
|-valign="top"
| 
! scope="row" | 
| Aquitaine Midi-Pyrénées Limousin Auvergne Rhône-Alpes – passing just south of Grenoble Provence-Alpes-Côte d'Azur
|-valign="top"
| 
! scope="row" | 
| Piedmont – passing just south of Turin Lombardy - passing by Voghera Emilia-Romagna – passing just south of Piacenza Lombardy Veneto – passing just south of Rovigo
|-
| style="background:#b0e0e6;" | 
! scope="row" style="background:#b0e0e6;" | Adriatic Sea
| style="background:#b0e0e6;" | Gulf of Venice
|-valign="top"
| 
! scope="row" | 
| Istrian Peninsula, islands of Cres and Krk, and the mainland again
|-
| 
! scope="row" | 
|
|-
| 
! scope="row" | 
|
|-valign="top"
| 
! scope="row" | 
| Passing through the centre of Ruma and through northern part of Sremska MitrovicaPassing through the northern edge of Stara Pazova, 30 kilometres NW of Belgrade
|-
| 
! scope="row" | 
| Passing just north of Ploiești and just south of Târgu Jiu and Râmnicu Vâlcea
|-
| style="background:#b0e0e6;" | 
! scope="row" style="background:#b0e0e6;" | Black Sea
| style="background:#b0e0e6;" |
|-valign="top"
| 
! scope="row" | Crimea 
|-
| style="background:#b0e0e6;" | 
! scope="row" style="background:#b0e0e6;" | Black Sea
| style="background:#b0e0e6;" |
|-
| 
! scope="row" | 
| Passing just south of Krasnodar, and just south of Stavropol
|-
| style="background:#b0e0e6;" | 
! scope="row" style="background:#b0e0e6;" | Caspian Sea
| style="background:#b0e0e6;" |
|-
| 
! scope="row" | 
| Mangystau Province
|-
| 
! scope="row" | 
| Karakalpakstan (autonomous republic) – including Vozrozhdeniya Island in the Aral Sea
|-valign="top"
| 
! scope="row" | 
| Kyzylorda Province South Kazakhstan Province Zhambyl Province Almaty Province
|-
| 
! scope="row" | 
| Xinjiang – passing through a 45×90 point (halfway between the North Pole and the Equator, and halfway between the Prime Meridian and the 180th meridian)
|-valign="top"
| 
! scope="row" | 
| Govi-Altai Province Bayankhongor Province Övörkhangai Province Dundgovi Province Dornogovi Province
|-
| 
! scope="row" | 
| Inner Mongolia
|-
| 
! scope="row" |  
| Sükhbaatar Province
|-valign="top"
| 
! scope="row" | 
| Inner Mongolia Jilin Heilongjiang
|-
| 
! scope="row" | 
| Primorsky Krai - passing through Lake Khanka
|-
| style="background:#b0e0e6;" | 
! scope="row" style="background:#b0e0e6;" | Sea of Japan
| style="background:#b0e0e6;" | Passing just south of Rishiri Island, 
|-
| 
! scope="row" | 
| Hokkaidō
|-
| style="background:#b0e0e6;" | 
! scope="row" style="background:#b0e0e6;" | Sea of Okhotsk
| style="background:#b0e0e6;" |
|-
| 
! scope="row" | Kuril Islands
|-
| style="background:#b0e0e6;" | 
! scope="row" style="background:#b0e0e6;" | Pacific Ocean
| style="background:#b0e0e6;" |
|- valign="top"
| 
! scope="row" | 
| Oregon – passing just north of Salem Idaho Montana Montana / Wyoming border South Dakota Minnesota – passing through Minneapolis Wisconsin – passing through a 45×90 point (halfway between the North Pole and the Equator, and halfway between the Prime Meridian and the 180th meridian)
|-
| style="background:#b0e0e6;" | 
! scope="row" style="background:#b0e0e6;" | Lake Michigan
| style="background:#b0e0e6;" | Green Bay – territorial waters of the United States
|-
| 
! scope="row" | 
| Wisconsin – Door Peninsula
|-
| style="background:#b0e0e6;" | 
! scope="row" style="background:#b0e0e6;" | Lake Michigan
| style="background:#b0e0e6;" | Territorial waters of the United States
|-
| 
! scope="row" | 
| Michigan – South Manitou Island
|-
| style="background:#b0e0e6;" | 
! scope="row" style="background:#b0e0e6;" | Lake Michigan
| style="background:#b0e0e6;" | Territorial waters of the United States
|-
| 
! scope="row" | 
| Michigan – Leelanau Peninsula (Leelanau County)
|-
| style="background:#b0e0e6;" | 
! scope="row" style="background:#b0e0e6;" | Lake Michigan
| style="background:#b0e0e6;" | Grand Traverse Bay – territorial waters of the United States
|-
| 
! scope="row" | 
| Michigan (Antrim County, Otsego County, Montmorency County, and Alpena County) 
|-
| style="background:#b0e0e6;" | 
! scope="row" style="background:#b0e0e6;" | Lake Huron
| style="background:#b0e0e6;" | Territorial waters of the United States and Canada
|-
| 
! scope="row" | 
| Ontario – Bruce Peninsula
|-
| style="background:#b0e0e6;" | 
! scope="row" style="background:#b0e0e6;" | Lake Huron
| style="background:#b0e0e6;" | Georgian Bay – territorial waters of Canada
|-
| 
! scope="row" | 
| Ontario
|-
| 
! scope="row" | 
| New York state – for about 
|-valign="top"
| 
! scope="row" | 
| Ontario – Cornwall Island Quebec – running just north of the border with New York, 
|-valign="top"
| 
! scope="row" | 
| New York – running just south of the border with Quebec,  Vermont – running just south of the border with Quebec ,  New Hampshire Maine
|-
| style="background:#b0e0e6;" | 
! scope="row" style="background:#b0e0e6;" | Passamaquoddy Bay
| style="background:#b0e0e6;" |
|-
| 
! scope="row" | 
| Deer Island, New Brunswick
|-
| style="background:#b0e0e6;" | 
! scope="row" style="background:#b0e0e6;" | Bay of Fundy
| style="background:#b0e0e6;" | Territorial waters of Canada
|-
| 
! scope="row" | 
| Nova Scotia – passing just north of Fort Edward
|-
| style="background:#b0e0e6;" | 
! scope="row" style="background:#b0e0e6;" | Atlantic Ocean
| style="background:#b0e0e6;" |
|-
| 
! scope="row" | 
| Aquitaine – passing just north of Bordeaux
|-
|}

Europe

In Europe the 45th parallel hits the Bay of Biscay coast of France in the west. It crosses the river Rhône at Pont-de-l'Isère, just north of Valence, Drôme and through Grenoble. It then continues across the Massif Central and into the Aquitaine region.  The city of Bordeaux is just south of the parallel. East of Bordeaux, in the municipality of Saint Seurin sur l'Isle, it intersects the Prime Meridian in the corner of an unremarkable field by the side of the A89 highway. There is no marker or other indication of this singular point on the parallel. It can, however, be visited easily by taking secondary roads from Saint Seurin and consulting a standard GPS signal.

In northern Italy it parallels the river Po, near Rovigo, passing by Voghera, then just south of Turin before passing into France in the Cottian Alps.

Further east it passes through the Balkans: Romania (just north of Ploiești, and through Târgu Jiu), the Serbian autonomous province of Vojvodina, the eastern tip of Croatia, the northern edge of Bosnia and Herzegovina, and a section of Adriatic Croatia. The capital city of Serbia – Belgrade is just south of the parallel.

In Russia it runs from the west coast of the Caspian Sea to the east coast of the Black Sea, through the Republic of Kalmykia, Stavropol Krai and its capital Stavropol, and Krasnodar Krai and its capital Krasnodar.  In Ukraine it crosses the Crimea and its capital Simferopol.

Asia

After leaving Russia the parallel passes through southern Kazakhstan, skirting the northern edge of the Ustyurt Plateau. It intersects the city of Burylbaytal at the southern tip of Lake Balkhash and the city of Qyzylorda further west.  At the border with Uzbekistan it bisects the Aral Sea and its toxic Vozrozhdeniya Island peninsula, site of an abandoned Soviet bioweapons laboratory.

In northwest China it passes through the Ili Kazakh Autonomous Prefecture in Xinjiang and the oil city of Karamay. Transecting southern Mongolia it passes through the provinces of Sükhbaatar, Dornogovi (and its capital Sainshand), Dundgovi, Övörkhangai, Bayankhongor, Govi-Altai, and Khovd.  At Khanka Lake it enters northeast China, cutting across Heilongjiang and continuing through part of Jilin and eastern Inner Mongolia.

It leaves the Asian mainland on the coast of Primorsky Krai in Russia, north of Vladivostok and continues through the northern part of the Sea of Japan. It passes through Rishiri-Rebun-Sarobetsu National Park and the adjacent town of Horonobe on the northern tip of Hokkaidō, the northernmost of Japan's main islands, before heading east across the North Pacific Ocean.

North America

Throughout the United States the parallel is marked in many places on highways by a sign proclaiming that the location is halfway between the North Pole and the equator.

The 45th parallel forms some boundaries of or passes through many U.S. states: Oregon, Idaho, Montana, Wyoming, South Dakota, Minnesota, Wisconsin, Michigan, New York, Vermont, New Hampshire and Maine, as well as going through the Canadian provinces of Ontario, Quebec, New Brunswick and Nova Scotia. The parallel once formed the northern boundary of the original Colony of Virginia, as outlined in the London Company charter.

Going from west to east, the line makes landfall at the Pacific coast in Oregon. After crossing Idaho and the Rocky Mountains, it makes up most of the boundary between Montana and Wyoming. It then passes through the Great Plains and continues further East directly through Minneapolis, MN. 

In Michigan, the Old Mission Peninsula in Grand Traverse Bay ends just shy of the 45th parallel. Many guidebooks and signs at the Mission Point Lighthouse describe it as being halfway between the equator and north pole. When the Grand Traverse Bay recedes below normal level, it is possible to walk out to the exact line.

Further east, the 45th parallel roughly marks the Canada–United States border between the St. Lawrence and Connecticut rivers, between the Canadian province of Quebec and the states of New York and Vermont. The parallel is sometimes called the "Canada line" or the Collins–Valentine line. After the Seven Years' War, the 45th parallel was declared the boundary between New York and Quebec. Under the Webster–Ashburton Treaty of 1842, original measurement errors stand so that the boundary is not exactly at 45 degrees north but is where the survey monuments were erected in 1772.

All of mainland New Brunswick lies north of the 45th parallel. Approximately two-thirds of Deer Island, plus all of Campobello and Grand Manan islands, are south of the 45th parallel.

The parallel roughly bisects mainland Nova Scotia.

See also
45th parallel south
44th parallel north
46th parallel north
45×90 points

Notes

References

External links

The 45th Parallel at the Minnesota Museum of the Mississippi and Other Natural Wonders
From the Minas Astronomy Group: Midway from the Equator to the North Pole
45th Parallel Markers
Degree Confluence Project

n45
Canada–United States border
Borders of Montana
Borders of Wyoming